Helena Henschen (1940–2011) was a Swedish designer and writer. Born and raised in Stockholm, she worked as a graphic designer, achieving success as an illustrator of children's books. She co-founded the famous design company Mah-Jong.

She won the EU Prize for Literature for her novel I skuggan av ett brott (The Shadow of a Crime), dealing with the von Sydow murders. Henschen was a niece of Fredrik von Sydow.

References

Further reading 
 

1940 births
2011 deaths
Swedish designers
Swedish women novelists
Swedish illustrators
Swedish women illustrators
Swedish children's book illustrators
20th-century Swedish novelists
20th-century Swedish women writers